Fight for Love may refer to:

 A Fight for Love, a 1919 silent film starring Harry Carey
 Fight for Love (54-40 album), the group's 1989 album
 Fight for Love (Elliott Yamin album), the artist's 2009 album
"Fight for Love" (Elliott Yamin song), the lead single from the album of the same name
 "Fight for Love", a song by Babyface from his 2015 album Return of the Tender Lover
 "Fight for Love" (Courtney Act song), released in 2018
 Fight for Love (TV series), a Hong Kong modern serial drama
 Youngblood (1986 film), an American sports drama film released as Fight for Love in the Philippines in 1992
 Blood in Dispute, a 2015 Philippine-Cambodian film released as Fight for Love in the Philippines